Henry Yarde Buller Lopes, 1st Baron Roborough (24 March 1859 – 14 April 1938), known as Sir Henry Lopes, 4th Baronet from 1908 to 1938, of Maristow in the parish of Tamerton Foliot, Devon, was a British Conservative Party politician.

Life
Lopes was the only son of Sir Massey Lopes, 3rd Baronet and Bertha, daughter of John Yarde-Buller, 1st Baron Churston. He was elected to the House of Commons for Grantham in 1892, a seat he held until 1900. He succeeded his father in the baronetcy in 1908 and on 24 January 1938 he was raised to the peerage as Baron Roborough, of Maristow in the County of Devon. He served as High Sheriff of Devon in 1914.

Lord Roborough married Lady Alberta Louise Florence, daughter of William Edgcumbe, 4th Earl of Mount Edgcumbe, in 1891. He died in April 1938, less than three months after his elevation to the peerage, aged 79, and was succeeded in his titles by his son Massey. Lady Roborough died in 1941.

Lopes Hall at the University of Exeter is named in his honour.

Notes

References 
 Kidd, Charles, Williamson, David (editors). Debrett's Peerage and Baronetage (1990 edition). New York: St Martin's Press, 1990,

External links 

1859 births
1938 deaths
Conservative Party (UK) MPs for English constituencies
UK MPs 1892–1895
UK MPs 1895–1900
UK MPs who were granted peerages
High Sheriffs of Devon
People from Plymouth (district)
English people of Portuguese-Jewish descent
Henry
Jewish British politicians
Barons created by George VI
English people of Portuguese descent